Circassian may refer to:

 Circassia, a former geographical region located in present-day European Russia, Northern Caucasus
 Circassian coast, on the Black Sea
 Circassians, also known as Adyghe people
 Circassian diaspora
 Circassian language, a Northwest Caucasian language or subgroup of languages
 Circassians (historical ethnonym) — historical term, which used to be and partly is used today to denominate different peoples of the Black Sea shore and the Northern Caucasus.

Other uses
 USS Circassian (1862), a Union Navy steamship in the American Civil War

See also
 
 Cerchez (disambiguation)

Language and nationality disambiguation pages